Dolge Njive is a settlement in the Slovene Hills in the Municipality of Lenart in northeastern Slovenia. The area is part of the traditional region of Styria. It is now included in the Drava Statistical Region.

A small chapel in the settlement dates to the early 20th century.

References

External links
Dolge Njive on Geopedia

Populated places in the Municipality of Lenart